The Boys from St. Petri is a 1991 Danish drama film directed by Søren Kragh-Jacobsen. It was screened out of competition at the 1992 Cannes Film Festival. The film is inspired by the activities of the Churchill Club, but the actual plot is fiction. It is based on Bjarne Reuter's book Drengene fra Sankt Petri. It has been published in English as Boys from St. Petri.

Cast
 Tomas Villum Jensen as Lars Balstrup
 Morten Buch Jørgensen as Gunnar Balstrup
 Nikolaj Lie Kaas as Otto Hvidmann
 Christian Grønvall as Søren Brinck
 Karl Bille as Olaf 'Luffe' Juhl
 Søren Hytholm Jensen as Anders Møller
 Joachim Knop as Aage Terkilsen
 Xenia Lach-Nielsen as Irene
 Bent Mejding as Provst Johannes Balstrup
 Helle Merete Sørensen as Fru Ingeborg Balstrup
 Ida Nepper as Gerda Balstrup
 Philip Zandén as Jacob 'Rosen' Rosenheim
 Solbjørg Højfeldt as Fru Hvidmann
 Tilde Maja Frederiksen as Lis Hvidmann
 Amalie Ihle Alstrup as Kylle Hvidmann
 Sofie Wandrup as Bitten Hvidmann

References

External links

1991 films
1990s Danish-language films
1991 drama films
Films directed by Søren Kragh-Jacobsen
Danish drama films